The Nonce was a hip-hop duo from Los Angeles, California, that was active in the 1990s (releasing material from 1992 to 1999).  As part of the Project Blowed collective, working with Aceyalone, among others, the duo developed a reputation for smooth, jazzy, classy production, complemented by laid-back, smart rhymes (paying homage to the Old School emcees they grew up listening to in the mid-1980s).

1990-1995
In 1990, after their high school graduation, The Nonce began recording its first album. This album would however go unreleased (due to creative differences with their production company) until the master recordings were rediscovered in 2017. The following year, the album was finally released, appropriately titled 1990.

In 1992, the duo signed with Wild West Records and released its first single, “The Picnic Song,” but it was to be nearly two more years because of internal wrangling with the label until the duo would release its biggest single to date, “Mixtapes,” in 1994.

In 1995 a full-length album, World Ultimate, was released on Rick Rubin's American Recordings label (via Wild West Records). In 2005, to commemorate the album's 10-year anniversary, a Japanese re-issue surfaced in limited quantities. There are also plans to re-issue the album on Vinyl in the future. As of 2008, no official re-issue has surfaced.

The Sight of Things and Previously Unreleased Material
After World Ultimate came an EP, The Sight Of Things in 1998. In 2005, previously unreleased material from the Nonce was issued in the form of two compilations: Advanced Regression and The Right State of Mind.

Sach Solo material
Nouka Basetype, now known as Sach, began to release solo material from 1998 with the cassette only album Seven Days To Engineer. He followed that up in 2002 with the Mary Joy released LP, Suckas Hate Me. 2005 saw the release of his 3rd solo album, Sach 5th Ave. In 2018, Sach published a book of poems and paintings entitled Rhyme Book Bibliomancy. Sach also produced tracks for numerous Los Angeles underground hip hop artists such as Global Phlowtations, Ganjah K, Medusa, Figures of Speech, Studious Steve, Freestyle Fellowship etc.

Death of Yusef
On May 21, 2000, Yusef "Afloat" Muhammad was found dead on the side of Freeway 110 in Los Angeles. He was 28 years old. The official cause of death, as well as the circumstances that led to his being found on the side of Freeway 110, remains unknown.

Discography

Albums
 World Ultimate (1995)
 World Ultimate (New Edition) (2005)
 1990 (2018) (Album recorded in 1990)

EPs
 The Sight of Things (1998) Wild West Records/Fluid Recordings

Singles
 The Picnic Song (1992) Wild West/American Recordings/Warner Bros. Records
 Mix Tapes (Promo) (1993) Wild West/American Recordings/Warner Bros. Records
 Mix Tapes / Keep it On (1994) Wild West/American Recordings/Warner Bros. Records
 Mix Tapes (The Remixes) (1994) Wild West/American Recordings/Warner Bros. Records
 From the Ground Up (1994) Wild West/American Recordings/Warner Bros. Records
 Bus Stops (Where the Honeys is At...) (1995) Wild West/American Recordings/Warner Bros. Records
 Live & Direct/ADR Most Requested (1997) Wild West/American Recordings/Warner Bros. Records
 Turnin' it Out (1999) Wild West/American Recordings/Warner Bros. Records
 Haiku Busho Sach San/The Only (2006) Fluid Records

Compilations
 Advanced Regression (2005)
 The Right State of Mind (2005)
 Advanced State of Regression (2006)
 The Only Mixtape - Mixed By Bachir (2010)

References

Musical groups from Los Angeles
Hip hop groups from California
Warner Records artists
1992 establishments in California
Musical groups established in 1992
Musical groups disestablished in 1999
Project Blowed
Hip hop duos
American musical duos